Disability in Ghana has a massive amount of stigma; children or people who are born disabled or deformed are assumed to be possessed by evil spirits.

Policy and legislation
Although Ghana signed the United Nations Convention on the Rights of Persons with Disabilities in March 2007, the government took until August 2012 to ratify it.

An estimated five million Ghanaians have disabilities, of which 2.8 million have a mental disability, however only one percent of the country's health budget is earmarked for mental health services.

In 2013 legislation prohibited the killing of newborn babies with disabilities, so called "Spirit children".

Spirit children 

A "spirit child" in Ghana is a disabled child who is believed to possess magical powers to cause misfortune. Disability in Ghana is greatly stigmatized and the only way considered acceptable to deal with the problem is to kill them via advice by a witchdoctor. Spirit children are referred to as chichuru or kinkiriko in the Kassena-Nankana District in Northern Ghana. These children primarily come from poor, rural areas. However, if a spirit child is known to be "good" there are no punishments for the child or their family.

Sport
Ghana has sent a team to every Summer Paralympic Games since 2004, they have not won any medals yet.

Ghana Federation of Disability Organisations 
The Ghana Federation of Disability Organisations is an umbrella group, founded in 1987, of smaller organisations representing various persons with disabilities in Ghana. The group has branches in nearly every one of Ghana's districts.

According to their website, the GFD's vision is "an inclusive society for all persons with disabilities in Ghana." Its mission is "to advocate the rights of Persons with Disability by influencing policies, programmes and activities at the national and local levels and to strengthen the organizations of Persons with Disabilities." Some of their successes so far have been at the political level, such as the "introduction of [a] tactile ballot system," allowing blind citizens to vote on their own since 2004; voter registration and participation for those in psychiatric hospitals since 2012; and advocacy for the 2006 Persons with Disability Act (Act 715) and the 2012 Mental Health Act (Act 846). In 2016, the GFD continued fighting for clarification of the Disability Act of 2006 by petitioning President John Dramani Mahama, hoping to increase protection of equality and public health-related provisions.

The GFD currently includes the Ghana Blind Union, Ghana National Association of the Deaf, Ghana Society of the Physically Disabled, Ghana Association of Persons with Albinism, Mental Health Society of Ghana, and Burns Survivors Association, as well as Inclusion Ghana which specialize in intellectual disability and Share Care Ghana which specialize in auto-immune and neurological disorders.

Mental Illness 
Out of a population of over 21.6 million, 650,000 Ghanaians have some type of acute mental disorder. An additional 2,166,000 have a moderate mental disability. Ghana provides only three psychiatric hospitals throughout the country to help those who have a mental disability. Also, for inpatient care there are 7 inpatient units (in general hospitals and clinics) and 4 community residential units.

Ghana is said to be "the most religious society in the world" (Religion in Ghana), with 96% of the population identifying with a particular spiritual belief. Mental illness is seen as caused by curses or demons. The only perceived solution to this problem is through spiritual healing, like prayer, with only minimal medical help such as through medication.

Prayer camps for the mentally ill 

Ghana has religious institutes, known as Prayer camps, that replace hospital care for individuals with disabilities and other serious health issues. People with any mental illness are kept there against their will, suffer beatings, and are starved and chained. They receive only insignificant treatment and care.

A 2016 Yale University study showed that both prayer camp prophets and staff and psychiatric hospital mental health professionals show interest at the idea of collaboration. Specifically, prayer camp staff are interested in help with the provision and use of medication, as well as improving the hygiene and infrastructure of prayer camps. However, prayer camp staff are highly opposed to medical explanations of mental illness, instead preferring spiritual and traditional explanations, while mental health and medical staff are concerned with the practice of extended chainings and fastings. Furthermore, despite the importance of long-term medication use in patient recovery, prayer camp staff only endorse its use over short periods.

See also 
 Health in Ghana
 Deafness in Ghana

References

 
Disability in Africa